Glenn David Ellison (born 1965) is an American economist who is Gregory K. Palm Professor of Economics at the Massachusetts Institute of Technology (MIT) and an Elected Fellow of the Society for the Advancement of Economic Theory and American Academy of Arts & Sciences.

Education and career 
Ellison received an A.B. degree in mathematics from Harvard College. He went on to Cambridge University on a Churchill Scholarship and received an M.Phil. degree in economics in 1988. He then worked briefly as an Associate at Charles River Associates between 1988 and 1989. He received his Ph.D. in economics from MIT in 1992 under the supervision of Drew Fudenberg.  After his doctorate, he became an Assistant Professor of Economics at Harvard University from 1992 to 1994. He moved to MIT since 1994 and became head of the Department of Economics between 2016 and 2017 and again since 2020.

Ellison's research interests include game theory, industrial organization, education, finance, economic geography, and academia.

Honors and awards 
Ellison is a Fellow of the American Academy of Arts and Sciences, the Econometric Society, and the Society for the Advancement of Economic Theory, and has received several awards, including an Alfred P. Sloan Research Fellowship and a fellowship from the Center for Advanced Studies in the Behavioral Sciences. He has served on the National Science Foundation Economics Panel and as a council member for the Econometric Society.

Personal life 
Ellison married Sara Fisher Ellison, a senior lecturer in economics at MIT. They have three daughters, Caroline, Anna, and Kate. Caroline is known for her work as the CEO of Alameda Research, a defunct cryptocurrency trading firm tied to the collapse of FTX, for which she has pleaded guilty to multiple financial crimes.

Ellison spends time as a math coach for schoolchildren and wrote textbooks for the purpose.

References

1965 births
Living people
MIT School of Humanities, Arts, and Social Sciences faculty
American economists
Massachusetts Institute of Technology alumni
Alumni of Churchill College, Cambridge
Economics journal editors
Fellows of the Econometric Society
Fellows of the American Academy of Arts and Sciences
Harvard College alumni